Jahangir Hasanzade (born 4 August 1979) is a retired Azerbaijani footballer who last played for Khazar Lankaran.

Career
Jahangir Hasanzade began his career at Baku clubs, such as MOIK, Farid and Bakili. In 1998, Azerbaijan national football team former head coach Ahmad Alaskarov invited him to Neftchi Baku. Hasanzade became the No. 1 immediately and played a key role in 1998-99 Azerbaijan Cup final game. Later, he became the main goalkeeper national team, especially after a brilliant performance in a 2–0 win against Slovakia.

After Neftchi and one-year loan in Shafa Jahangir went to Ukraine and played for Volyn and Tavriya in the Ukraine Premier League. First part of experience was not so successful, but at Tavriya he was a main goalkeeper till his return to Neftchi, where Hasanzade achieved his first championship.

In 2005, Jahangir Hasanzade unexpectedly cancelled contract with Neftchi and was signed by Karabakh. At the end of the season, he raised his 3rd Azerbaijan Cup.

For Inter Baku, where he won Azerbaijan Premier League for the second time, Jahangir capped only 6 times. He also failed to be the main goalkeeper in Gabala FC, and in 2009 signed a contract with AZAL PFC.

During 3 years Hasanzade capped for AZAL PFC over 80 times. In November 2012, he became the captain of the team.

In August 2014, Hasanzade moved to fellow Azerbaijan Premier League side Khazar Lankaran, signing a one-year contract.

Honours

Club
Neftchi Baku
Azerbaijan Premier League: (1) 2004–05
Azerbaijan Cup: (2) 1998–99,2000–01

FK Qarabağ
Azerbaijan Cup: (1) 2005–06

Inter Baku
Azerbaijan Premier League: (1) 2007–08

References

External links
 
 

1979 births
Living people
Azerbaijani footballers
Azerbaijani people of Iranian descent
Azerbaijan international footballers
Azerbaijani expatriate footballers
SC Tavriya Simferopol players
Shamakhi FK players
FC Volyn Lutsk players
Ukrainian Premier League players
Expatriate footballers in Ukraine
Azerbaijani expatriate sportspeople in Ukraine
Gabala FC players
MOIK Baku players
Association football goalkeepers
Neftçi PFK players